The 2019–20 season is San Lorenzo's 35th consecutive season in the top division of Argentine football. In addition to the Primera División, the club are competing in the Copa Argentina, Copa de la Superliga and Copa Libertadores.

The season generally covers the period from 1 July 2019 to 30 June 2020.

Review

Pre-season
San Lorenzo snapped up Chacarita Juniors youngster Franco Romero in May. Germán Berterame sealed a move away on 6 June, agreeing a transfer to Atlético San Luis of Liga MX; a deal that was officially completed on 14 June. The club agreed, in principle, to the transfers of Unión Santa Fe brothers Bruno and Mauro Pittón on 21 June; subject to terms and medicals. The duo completed their moves in the following twenty-four hours. On 24 June, San Lorenzo announced the signing of Ezequiel Cerutti; days after the winger had terminated his contract with Al-Hilal of the Saudi Professional League. Gonzalo Jaque and Ezequiel Ávila sealed departures on 26/27 June. Santiago Vergini, having spent 2018–19 with Bursaspor, returned home with San Lorenzo on 27 June.

Lucas Menossi joined on 28 June. Rodrigo De Ciancio departed San Lorenzo for Atlanta on 29 June, a day prior to Santiago González heading to Nueva Chicago on loan. 2018–19 loans expired on/around 30 June. Juan Antonio Pizzi's men took on their reserves on 3 July to kick off their pre-season schedule. A win and a loss occurred in games on 6 July versus Deportivo Morón, with San Lorenzo winning 3–0. Gabriel Rojas was loaned to Peñarol on 6 July. Adam Bareiro became San Lorenzo's seventh reinforcement, as he penned a one-year loan deal, with a purchase option, from Liga MX's Monterrey. Alejandro Melo agreed a move to Coquimbo Unido. Estudiantes were met in friendlies on 13 July, with a goalless draw being followed by a 3–2 home win.

Aldosivi completed the signing of Román Martínez on 18 July. Also on that day, Ferro Carril Oeste were defeated in exhibition matches at the Estadio Pedro Bidegain. Damián Pérez went to Spain with Sporting Gijón on 19 July. Gerónimo Poblete came on loan from Metz on 21 July, having spent the past season loaned to San Lorenzo from the French outfit. Tomás Conechny was signed permanently by Major League Soccer's Portland Timbers on 22 July, after spending the past twelve months on loan in the United States. Soon after, Ariel Rojas headed off to Atlético Tucumán.

July
San Lorenzo played the first leg of their Copa Libertadores round of sixteen tie with Cerro Porteño of Paraguay on 24 July, with the encounter ending in a goalless draw in Buenos Aires. Raúl Loaiza's loan from Atlético Nacional was ended in July, allowing him to sign for Defensa y Justicia on 25 July. San Lorenzo started their league season with a win over Godoy Cruz on 27 July, with Nicolás Blandi securing the points with a late penalty. Juan Ramírez put pen to paper on a four-year contract from Talleres on 30 July. Gonzalo Castellani became the eighth player to leave San Lorenzo on 30 July, as he agreed terms with Atlético Tucumán. San Lorenzo were eliminated from the Copa Libertadores on 31 July, as Cerro Porteño beat them 2–1 in the second leg in Paraguay.

August
3 August saw youth player Gonzalo Berterame depart to Gimnasia y Esgrima (M). San Lorenzo followed up their Primera División victory on 27 July with another three points over Gimnasia y Esgrima (LP) on 4 August. Felix Villacorta signed for Uruguayan Segunda División side Atenas on 6 August. On 8 August, San Lorenzo announced the double signing of twin brothers Ángel Romero (Corinthians) and Óscar Romero (Shanghai Shenhua). Alejandro Molina was loaned to Gimnasia y Esgrima (M) on 12 August. Nicolás Reniero transferred to Eduardo Coudet's Racing Club on 13 August. Santamarina captured Jonás Acevedo on loan on 14 August. San Lorenzo came from two down to secure a point at the Estadio Pedro Bidegain versus Rosario Central on 17 August.

On 19 August, Spanish third tier club Cultural Leonesa revealed the loan signing of Gabriel Gudiño. San Lorenzo continued their undefeated streak in the Primera División on 23 August, as well as ending the perfect start of Arsenal de Sarandí at the Estadio Julio Humberto Grondona after strikes from Juan Ramírez and Nicolás Blandi. San Lorenzo maintained their unbeaten beginning to the league season with a win over Unión Santa Fe on 31 August.

Squad

Transfers
Domestic transfer windows:3 July 2019 to 24 September 201920 January 2020 to 19 February 2020.

Transfers in

Transfers out

Loans in

Loans out

Friendlies

Pre-season
Deportivo Morón announced an exhibition fixture with San Lorenzo on 19 June 2019, with the match set for 6 July. A trip to Estudiantes was confirmed on 22 June for 13 July. However, the game's host was reversed on 28 June as their opponents revealed it would take place at the Estadio Pedro Bidegain. Friendlies with their reserves started their pre-season. Details for the encounter with Deportivo Morón were set on 5 July. A fixture with Ferro Carril Oeste was revealed on 12 July.

Competitions

Primera División

League table

Relegation table

Source: AFA

Results summary

Matches
The fixtures for the 2019–20 campaign were released on 10 July.

Copa Argentina

Copa de la Superliga

Copa Libertadores

San Lorenzo's opponents for the Copa Libertadores round of sixteen were drawn in May 2019, as they received Cerro Porteño of the Paraguayan Primera División.

Squad statistics

Appearances and goals

Statistics accurate as of 31 August 2019.

Goalscorers

Notes

References

San Lorenzo de Almagro seasons
San Lorenzo